Collemancio is a frazione of the comune of Cannara in the Province of Perugia, Umbria, central Italy. It stands at an elevation of 507 metres above sea level. At the time of the Istat census of 2001 it had 78 inhabitants.

References 

Frazioni of the Province of Perugia
Former municipalities of Umbria